The 1977 Big Eight Conference men's basketball tournament was held March 1–4 at Kemper Arena in Kansas City, Missouri. This was the inaugural edition of the tournament.

 defeated Missouri in the championship game, 72–67 (in overtime), to take home their first Big 8 men's basketball tournament.

The Wildcats, in turn, received a bid to the 1977 NCAA tournament. Kansas State was the only Big 8 team to qualify for the tournament.

Format
All eight of the conference's members participated in the tournament field. They were seeded based on regular season conference records, with all teams beginning play in the initial quarterfinal round.

All first round games were played on the home court of the higher-seeded team. The semifinals and championship game, in turn, were played at a neutral site at Kemper Arena in Kansas City, Missouri.

Bracket

References

Tournament
Big Eight Conference men's basketball tournament
Big Eight Conference men's basketball tournament
Big Eight Conference men's basketball tournament